Pier 11/Wall Street is a pier providing slips to ferries and excursion boats on the East River in the Port of New York and New Jersey. It is located east of South Street and  FDR Drive just south of Wall Street in Lower Manhattan, New York City. The ferry terminal has five landings (A, B, C, D, E), each with two berths, and is used by four privately owned companies.

Service

SeaStreak

SeaStreak catamarans operate daily to the Raritan Bayshore in Monmouth County, New Jersey. Journeys originate at the East 34th Street Ferry Landing, West Midtown Ferry Terminal, and Battery Park City Ferry Terminal. After calling at Pier 11/Wall Street boats continue through The Narrows and to terminals at Atlantic Highlands, Highlands, or Belford.

Seasonal excursions and sightseeing trips include service to Sandy Hook, Cold Spring, Bear Mountain State Park, West Point, Martha's Vineyard, and Nantucket.

SeaStreak formerly operated weekday commuter service to Rockaway, Queens. The service began in November 2012 in the aftermath of Hurricane Sandy, which heavily damaged subway infrastructure in Queens and Brooklyn, but was discontinued in October 2014 once all repair work had been completed.

NY Waterway

NY Waterway operates ferries to points along the Hudson River Waterfront Walkway in Hudson County, New Jersey such as Weehawken Port Imperial, Hoboken Terminal, Paulus Hook Ferry Terminal. 

NY Waterway also operates the IKEA Express Shuttle to the IKEA store in Red Hook, Brooklyn. The ferry was formerly operated by New York Water Taxi.

NYC Ferry
Pier 11 Wall Street is a stop for all NYC Ferry routes, except for the St. George route, and the terminus of all except the South Brooklyn route. In 2016, the city drew up plans for routes to Bay Ridge, Rockaway, Governors Island, Astoria, Lower East Side, and Soundview. On May 1, 2017, NYC Ferry's Rockaway route started operations, and NY Waterway's East River route was transferred over to NYC Ferry operation. The Bay Ridge route began on June 1, a month later, and the Astoria route began on August 29 of the same year. The route to Soundview opened on August 15, 2018, followed by the Lower East Side route two weeks later, on August 29 which was then later discontinued on May 18, 2020. Wall St/Pier 11 used to be the northern terminal for the South Brooklyn line, before the line was extended to end at Corlears Hook on May 18, 2020.

Terminal building 
Designed by Henry Smith-Miller and Laurie Hawkinson, along with structural engineer Arup Group, the building was completed in 2000. The structure is made of glass, structural steel, and galvanized and corrugated material; these materials were used to evoke the waterfront. The building's entrances, on its western and eastern sides, are shaded by canopies. The Architectural League of New York displayed a model of the terminal building in 2001 as part of New New York 2, an exhibit showcasing six new buildings in New York City.

See also
South Street Seaport
Battery Park City Ferry Terminal
South Ferry
West Midtown Ferry Terminal
East 34th Street Ferry Landing
Paulus Hook Ferry Terminal
Weehawken Port Imperial
Fulton Ferry 
Battery Maritime Building
St. George Ferry Terminal
Liberty Street Ferry Terminal
Cortland Street Ferry Depot
Chambers Street Ferry Terminal

References

External links 

 SeaStreak
 New York Water Taxi
 New York Beach Ferry
 NY Waterway

Port of New York and New Jersey
Ferry terminals in Manhattan
Transportation buildings and structures in Manhattan
Transit hubs serving New Jersey
Financial District, Manhattan